Blessed Berardo dei Marsi (1079 – 3 November 1130) was a Catholic Italian cardinal. He was proclaimed Blessed in 1802 as he was deemed to be holy and that miracles were performed through his intercession.

Biography
Berardo dei Marsi was born in 1079 to Berardo and Theodosia. He was the great-uncle of Saint Rosalia. As a child he studied with the canons of the cathedral of Santa Sabina dei Marsi and also studied at Monte Cassino from 1095 to 1102. He became the governor of Campagna after Pope Paschal II appointed him to that position. He also served as an administrator to Campagna at the behest of the pope. The pope also elevated him to the cardinalate in 1099 as a Cardinal-Deacon and he opted for the order of Cardinal-Priest sometime after.

He was appointed as the Bishop of Marsi in 1113 and he proved to be a reformer in his diocese. He battled against simony and pushed for the idea of clerical celibacy.

He died in 1130 and predicted he would die on this day. He gave all his possessions to the poor in his will. He was buried in the cathedral of Santa Sabina and his relics were moved to Santa Maria delle Grazie in 1631.

Beatification
On account of miracles attributed to him and to his personal holiness, Pope Pius VII beatified him on 10 May 1802 and proclaimed him to be the patron of his diocese.

References

External links
Saints SQPN

1079 births
1130 deaths
12th-century Italian cardinals
Italian beatified people
12th-century venerated Christians
Venerated Catholics
Beatifications by Pope Pius VII